Christina Gustafsson (born 14 April 1951) is a Swedish sports shooter. She competed in two events at the 1984 Summer Olympics.

References

External links
 

1951 births
Living people
Swedish female sport shooters
Olympic shooters of Sweden
Shooters at the 1984 Summer Olympics
People from Eskilstuna
Sportspeople from Södermanland County